Symmachia estellina is a butterfly species in the family Riodinidae. It is present in French Guiana and Brazil.

See also 
 List of butterflies of French Guiana

References

External links

Symmachia
Lepidoptera of French Guiana
Butterflies described in 2008
Riodinidae of South America